John Petty (October 3, 1918April 5, 1979) was a professional American football fullback in the National Football League. He played one season for the Chicago Bears (1942).

1918 births
1979 deaths
People from Lebanon, Pennsylvania
Players of American football from Pennsylvania
American football fullbacks
Purdue Boilermakers football players
Chicago Bears players